The Standing Orders (Private Bills) Committee is a select committee of the House of Lords that deals with private bills. When the Examiner of Private Bills determines that the promoters of a private bill have not complied with the Standing Orders of the House of Lords relating to Private Business, the matter is referred to the Committee, who advise the House whether to waive the applicable standing orders. If the Examiner is in doubt as to whether the Standing Orders have been complied with, he may refer the matter to the Committee, who then decide the matter on their own authority. In the case of an unopposed private bill, the Chairman of Committees may act alone on behalf of the Committee.

Membership
As of February 2022, the membership of the committee is as follows:

External links
Standing Orders (Private Bills) Committee

Committees of the House of Lords